Cristóbal "Tòfol" Montiel Rodríguez (born 11 April 2000) is a Spanish professional footballer who plays as a midfielder.

Club career
A youth product of the RCD Mallorca youth academy, ACF Fiorentina signed Montiel on 16 June 2018 after activating his €2 million release clause. Montiel made his professional debut for Fiorentina in a 1–1 Serie A tie with Torino on 31 March 2019.

On 31 January 2020, he joined Vitória de Setúbal in Portugal on loan until the end of the 2019–20 season.

On 31 August 2021, he moved on loan to Siena. On 28 January 2022, he was loaned to Spanish club Atlético Baleares.

On 15 July 2022, Montiel's contract with Fiorentina was terminated by mutual consent.

Personal life
Montiel is the son of the Spanish former footballer Óscar Montiel.

References

External links
 

2000 births
Living people
Footballers from Palma de Mallorca
Association football midfielders
Spanish footballers
ACF Fiorentina players
Vitória F.C. players
A.C.N. Siena 1904 players
CD Atlético Baleares footballers
Serie A players
Primeira Liga players
Serie C players
Spanish expatriate footballers
Spanish expatriate sportspeople in Italy
Spanish expatriate sportspeople in Portugal
Expatriate footballers in Italy
Expatriate footballers in Portugal